Baljit Singh Padam (Punjabi: ਬਲਜੀਤ ਸਿੰਘ ਪਦਮ), better known by his stage name Dr. Zeus, is an Indian music composer, singer and music producer. He rose to fame in 2003 with his song "Kangna", which was voted the best song on BBC Asian Network in the same year. His other hits are "Don't Be Shy" and "Jugni Ji", which won the best single award in 2012. He has worked with singer Kanika Kapoor for the song "Jugni Ji" and with musician Jaz Dhami for the song "Zulfa". His song "Aag Ka Dariya" features on the Four Lions film soundtrack. A music video was also produced featuring Czech model Yana Gupta and singers Ravindra & DJ Shortie.

Career
Dr. Zeus began his career in 1999 where he was signed to the Envy music label based in Birmingham where he produced Pure Garage – Sue My Ass by the Punjabi singer Balwinder Singh Safri, from the band Safri Boyz. He had two songs in this album, which were "Sahiba Bani Prawa Di" and "Par Langa De Veh". A year later, he went on to produce his second complete album Deathjamm 4.5

Dr. Zeus released his debut solo album "The High Life" in 2001, on the Envy music label. This album featured the vocals of Amar Arshi singing "Gwandian Da Dhol". Dr. Zeus then released Unda Da Influence in 2003. Dr. Zeus released his third album, The Original Edit in 2005 with Lehmber Hussainpuri singing vocals. In 2006, Dr. Zeus released his remix album of greatest hits entitled The Street Remixes. In 2008, Dr. Zeus released an album titled Back Unda Da Influence. The song named "Sat Sri Akaal" hit No.1 on the BBC Asian Network Charts. Dr. Zeus stated on a BBC Asian Network interview that Back Unda Da Influence was recorded exclusively at his own studio (BFK Studio). In January 2011, Manpreet Sandhu's album The Spirit was released with music by Dr. Zeus. In April 2012, he released album Immortal: Nusrat at Kava with songs of Sufi singer Nusrat Fateh Ali Khan in a hip hop style. He has given music for the Punjabi films Daddy Cool Munde Fool and Jatt Boys Putt Jatta De and Hindi film Chaar Din Ki Chandni.

In the 2012 Brit Asia TV Music Awards (BAMA) Dr. Zeus was awarded "Best Asian Music Producer" and "Best Single" for "Jugni Ji", with Kanika Kapoor. In the 2015 BAMA, Dr. Zeus was awarded "Best Producer" and "Bollywood Record of the Year" for "Lovely", again with Kapoor.

Discography

Studio albums

Bollywood
2014 –  Happy New Year – 	"Lovely" & "Kamlee", sung by Kanika Kapoor, Fateh, Ravindra Upadhyay, Miraya Varma, Dr Zeus 
2015 -Dilliwali Zaalim Girlfriend - "Tipsy Hogai", sung by Miss Pooja, Rajveer Singh 
2015 –  Ek Paheli Leela –   "Desi Look", sung by Kanika Kapoor, Dr Zeus 
 2015 -  Second Hand Husband - Title Track, sung by Gippy Grewal
2015 –  Kis Kisko Pyaar Karoon –   "Bam Bam", sung by Kaur B, Simran Ram, Kapil Sharma, Dr Zeus; "Billi Kat Gayee", sung by  Ikka Singh, Rajveer Singh, Dr Zeus; "Hum Toh", sung by Kapil Sharma, Kundan Pandey
 2017 - Machine - "Break Fail", sung by Jasmine Sandlas, Rajveer Singh, Ikka
2022 - Cuttputlli - "Rabba", sung by Sukhwinder Singh; "Tu Dis De", sung by Hameed Ali Naqeebi
2022 - Ram Setu - TBA

Production discography

Films produced
2013: Daddy Cool Munde Fool (Artists: Amrinder Gill, Bilal Saeed, Jassi Gill, Amar Norie & Aman Sarang, Fateh Doe)
2015: Kis Kisko Pyaar Karoon (Artists: Kapil Sharma, Kaur B
2017: Road
2019: Laiye Je Yaarian (Artist: Amrinder Gill)
2019: Chal Mera Putt (Artists: Amrinder Gill, Gurshabad, Nimrat Khaira)
2020: Chal Mera Putt 2 (Artists: Amrinder Gill, Gurshabad)
2021: Chal Mera Putt 3 (Artists: Amrinder Gill, Gurshabad)

References

Living people
English record producers
People from Birmingham, West Midlands
English people of Indian descent
English people of Punjabi descent
English Sikhs
British people of Indian descent
British people of Punjabi descent
British Sikhs
Punjabi singers
Year of birth missing (living people)